Pavel Janků (born April 28, 1969) is a Czech professional ice hockey player. He played with BK Mladá Boleslav in the Czech Extraliga during the 2010–11 Czech Extraliga season.

References

External links 
 
 

1969 births
Living people
HC Oceláři Třinec players
Czech ice hockey forwards
People from Šumperk
Sportspeople from the Olomouc Region
Czechoslovak ice hockey forwards
HC Karlovy Vary players
PSG Berani Zlín players
HC Kometa Brno players
VHK Vsetín players
HC Slovan Ústečtí Lvi players